Belle Prater's Boy (1996) is a young adult novel by Ruth White that tells the story of 12-year-old Gypsy and her cousin Woodrow Prater, whose mother Belle Prater had mysteriously disappeared one morning. When Woodrow — the titular Belle Prater's boy — comes to town, she quickly befriends him in the hope that she will find out more about his mother's disappearance. The novel is set in 1950s Western Virginia. Belle Prater's Boy was named a Newbery Honor book in 1997, and a 1996 Boston Globe - Horn Book Awards Honor Book for Fiction

References

1996 American novels
Newbery Honor-winning works
American young adult novels